Alternanthera angustifolia  (narrow-leaf joyweed) is a small herb in family Amaranthaceae found widely in inland Australia from northern Western Australia, the Northern Territory, South Australia, New South Wales to Queensland.

It is a prostrate (or decumbent) annual herb, growing from 2 cm to 30 cm high, on sandy soils on creek and river banks. Its small white flowers may be seen from April to August.

Alternanthera angustifolia was first described in 1810 by Robert Brown.

References

External links
ALA: Alternanthera angustifolia: images and occurrence data

angustifolia
Plants described in 1810
Taxa named by Robert Brown (botanist, born 1773)